Anarrup is a genus of centipedes in the family Mecistocephalidae, native to Europe and Asia as far as Indonesia. These centipedes range from 6 cm to 8 cm in length. All species in this genus have 41 leg-bearing segments.

Species 
Currently accepted species include:
Anarrup flavipes Attems, 1930
Anarrup nesiotes Chamberlin, 1920

References 

Geophilomorpha